Apolipoprotein M is a protein that in humans is encoded by the APOM gene.

The protein encoded by this gene is an apolipoprotein and member of the lipocalin protein family. It is found associated with high density lipoproteins and to a lesser extent with low density lipoproteins and triglyceride-rich lipoproteins. The encoded protein is secreted through the plasma membrane but remains membrane-bound, where it is involved in lipid transport. Two transcript variants encoding two different isoforms have been found for this gene, but only one of them has been fully characterized.  The average molecular weight is 21253 Da, and the monoisotopic molecular weight is 21239 Da.

References

Further reading

External links 
 Applied Research on apoM